Leppington railway station is the terminus of the South West Rail Link which serves the south-western Sydney suburb of Leppington. It opened on 8 February 2015. A ten road stabling facility is located to the west of the station at Rossmore. There are 850 car park spaces available.

Platforms and services
Leppington has two island platforms with four faces. Initial services consisted of a half-hourly shuttle to Liverpool. From 13 December 2015, trains operate directly to the city via Granville. From 26 November 2017, Cumberland Line services stop at the station, providing a link to Parramatta, Blacktown, Schofields and Richmond.

Transport links
Interline Bus Services operate three routes via Leppington station:
855: Liverpool station to Bringelly
856: Liverpool station to Austral
858: to Oran Park
Busabout operate one route via Leppington station:
841: to Narellan

Gallery

References

External links

Leppington station details Transport for New South Wales

Easy Access railway stations in Sydney
Railway stations in Sydney
Railway stations in Australia opened in 2015
South West Rail Link
City of Liverpool (New South Wales)
Camden Council (New South Wales)